Gerlinci (Prekmurje Slovene: Göronci) is a village in the Municipality of Cankova in the Prekmurje region of northeastern Slovenia.

There is a small chapel in the settlement. It was built in 1861 and is dedicated to Saint Anthony of Padua. It belongs to the Parish of Pertoča.

References

External links 
Gerlinci on Geopedia

Populated places in the Municipality of Cankova